Bonconto (Bonkonto) refers to different administrative divisions of Senegal.

Bonconto Arrondissement
Bonconto (commune)